KXDG is a mainstream rock radio station licensed to Webb City, Missouri, owned by Zimmer Radio Group. KXDG began broadcasting in HD Radio in 2006 and ceased HD Radio broadcast in 2014. It was the first radio station in the four-state area to begin multicasting. Its slogan is "Big Dog 97.9 Joplin's Rock Station and The 4 States Rocker Big Dog 97.9"

External links

XDG
Mainstream rock radio stations in the United States